Louis Léger (15 January 1843– 30 April 1923) was a French writer and pioneer in Slavic studies. He was honorary member of Bulgarian Literary Society (now Bulgarian Academy of Sciences, also member of Académie des inscriptions et belles-lettres in Paris. Academic institutions in Saint-Petersburg, Belgrade and Bucharest had given him a different status of membership.

Léger studied under Aleksander Chodźko at the Collège de France, whose position he eventually succeeded in 1885 by taking up the Slav Literature and Language chair of Adam Mickiewicz, which he occupied until 1923. Léger claimed that those who had not lived during the Second French Empire could not possibly imagine the effect of Polish influence on French society. Léger helped translate various Polish works.

His "A History of Austro-Hungary", first edition published in 1879 and last in 1920, was considered one of the best textbooks on the subject in any Western language.

In 1916, Tomas Garrique Masaryk and Edvard Beneš founded the Comité national tchèque in Paris, and almost at the same time Louis Eisenmann, Léger, and Ernest Denis founded the Comité national d'études , which also advocated for the independence of a Czech state. In 1918, the French government created Czechoslovak legions, which represented a significant auxiliary force at a decisive phase of the war after Russia had made peace. On 28 October 1918, the Republic of Czechoslovakia was proclaimed in Prague.

Works

 
 La Crise autrichienne, Paris, 1868
 Histoire de Autriche-Hongrie, Paris, 1879
 Contes Populaires Slaves, 1882
 
 La Bulgarie, Paris, 1885
 Nouvelles études slaves histoire et littérature, 1886
 Russes et Slaves, études politiques et littéraires, Hachette, 1890
 
 Le monde slave, études politiques et littéraires, Hachette, 1902
 Moscou, 1910
 Nicolas Gogol, 1913

Notes

External links
 

Translators from Polish
1843 births
1923 deaths
Writers from Toulouse
Members of the Académie des Inscriptions et Belles-Lettres
Honorary members of the Saint Petersburg Academy of Sciences
Members of the Bulgarian Academy of Sciences
French male writers
Academic staff of the Collège de France
Members of the Ligue de la patrie française
Cyrillo-Methodian studies